The following is a list of year in sumo articles listed in chronological order from the most recent. Each gives an overview of the happenings in sumo for each year listed. The highlights below refer only to top division championships.

2020s
2023 in sumo
2022 in sumo - Wakatakakage, Ichinojō, and abi win their first top division titles.
2021 in sumo - Kakuryū and Hakuho retire. Terunofuji is promoted to yokozuna.
2020 in sumo - Gōeidō and Kotoshōgiku retire, the May basho is cancelled due to the ongoing COVID-19 pandemic.

2010s
2019 in sumo - Kisenosato retires
2018 in sumo - Tochinoshin wins his first championship.
2017 in sumo - Kisenosato is promoted to yokozuna, Harumafuji retires.
2016 in sumo - Kotoshogiku and Goeido win the first championships by Japanese-born wrestlers in ten years 
2015 in sumo - Hakuhō wins a record-breaking 33rd top division championship
2014 in sumo - Kakuryū wins first championship and is promoted to yokozuna
2013 in sumo - Sokokurai becomes the first expelled wrestler to be reinstated
2012 in sumo - Baruto and Kyokutenhō win their only championships. Harumafuji becomes yokozuna
2011 in sumo - A match-fixing scandal leads to the cancellation of the March tournament
2010 in sumo - Asashōryū retires after an alleged nightclub brawl, several wrestlers are suspended for illegal baseball gambling, Hakuhō goes on record postwar winning streak

2000s
2009 in sumo - Harumafuji's 1st championship, Hakuho has 3 championships and all-time record of 86 wins out of 90 in one year
2008 in sumo - Asashōryū returns, Kotoōshū first European champion, marijuana scandals begin
2007 in sumo - Hakuho is promoted to yokozuna, Asashōryū is first suspended yokozuna, Tokitsukaze stable hazing scandal 
2006 in sumo - Asashōryū's general dominance continues, Hakuho wins first championship
2005 in sumo - Asashōryū is first to sweep all championships in his "grand slam" year
2004 in sumo - Asashōryū just misses all championship sweep, Kaiō wins 5th and last championship
2003 in sumo - Takanohana and Musashimaru retire, Asashōryū debuts as yokozuna
2002 in sumo - Takanohana out most of year due to injury, Asashōryū wins first of many championships
2001 in sumo - number of wrestlers win championships in spite of injury, Kotomitsuki wins his only and all 3 special prizes 
2000 in sumo - 3 wrestlers win championships for first time, Akebono wins his last

1990s
1999 in sumo - Musashimaru dominates, Chiyotaikai and Dejima win their first championships
1998 in sumo - between them, the Futagoyama brothers dominate, Kotonishiki becomes only wrestler to win two championships at maegashira rank
1997 in sumo - Futagoyama wrestlers continue championship dominance
1996 in sumo - Takanohana takes 4 championships, and stablemate Takanonami one for a near year sweep
1995 in sumo - Takanohana takes 4 championships to dominate; his brother Wakanohana takes 1
1994 in sumo - Musashimaru wins 1st championship, Takanohana achieves necessary criteria for promotion to yokozuna
1993 in sumo - Akebono becomes first foreign-born yokozuna, has most dominant year at 4 championships, Futagoyama brothers take one each
1992 in sumo - Asahifuji retires leaving no yokozuna for the next eight months, championships are split Takahanada* 2, Akebono 2, and 1 each for Konishiki and Mitoizumi
1991 in sumo - Hokutoumi and Asahifuji win their last championships, Kotonishiki wins his first, Kirishima and Kotofuji win their only championships
1990 in sumo - championships split at two each between Ōzeki Asahifuji, and yokozunas Hokutoumi and Chiyonofuji, the second win would be Chiyonofuji's last

*Takahanada would later become the 2nd Takanohana.

1980s
1989 in sumo - Chiyonofuji and Hokutoumi vie for dominance at three and two championships respectively, Konishiki gets first tournament win
1988 in sumo - Asahifuji has first win, Chiyonofuji takes the last four tournaments and record for longest bout winning streak in modern sumo history - later surpassed by Hakuho
1987 in sumo - Hokutoumi and Onokuni are promoted to yokozuna; Futahaguro is forced to retire
1986 in sumo - Stablemates Chiyonofuji and Hoshi* claim all six Yusho with five and one respectively. Futahaguro is promoted to Yokozuna. Takanosato retires.
1985 in sumo - Chiyonofuji wins 4 of the 6 tournaments, Asashio IV wins his first and only yusho, Hokuten'yū wins 2nd and last yusho. Kitanoumi retires. The new Ryōgoku Kokugikan is opened.
1984 in sumo - Wakashimazu takes home his 1st and 2nd yusho, Kitanoumi wins his 24th and final yusho, Takanosato wins 4th and final yusho as well, surprise maegashira 12 Tagaryū claims a yusho, Chiyonofuji claims 10th yusho.
1983 in sumo - Both Chiyonofuji and Takanosato win 2 yusho, with Kotokaze and Hokuten'yū winning the other two. Takanosato is promoted to Yokozuna. Wakanohana II retires.
1982 in sumo - Chiyonofuji dominates winning 4 yusho, Kitanoumi and Takanosato win the other two.
1981 in sumo - Chiyonofuji and Kitanoumi vie for dominance at three and two championships respectively, Kotokaze gets first tournament win. Chiyonofuji promoted to Yokozuna. Wajima retires.
1980 in sumo - Kitanoumi wins 3 yusho, Mienoumi, Wakanohana II, and Wajima win their last titles. Mienoumi retires.
 
*Hoshi would later become Hokutoumi

1970s
1979 in sumo - Kitanoumi wins three tournaments, Mienoumi, Wajima, and Wakanohana II win the other three. Mienoumi is promoted to Yokozuna.
1978 in sumo - Kitanoumi dominates with 5 yusho, with Wakanohana II taking the other. Wakanohana II is promoted to Yokozuna.
1977 in sumo - Wajima and Kitanoumi again vie for dominance with 3 and 2 yusho respectively, Wakamisugi II* wins his first Championship.
1976 in sumo - Kitanoumi and Wajima vie for dominance with 3 and 2 yusho respectively, Kaiketsu wins his second and last yusho.
1975 in sumo - Kitanoumi and Takanohana I take 2 yusho, while Mienoumi and Kongo both take their first.
1974 in sumo - Wajima wins 3 yusho while Kitanoumi takes his first 2, Kaiketsu wins his first title. Kitanoumi promoted to Yokozuna. Both Kitanofuji and Kotozakura retire.
1973 in sumo - Wajima wins 3, Kotozakura wins 2, and Kitanofuji wins his last yusho. Kotozakura and Wajima are promoted to Yokozuna.
1972 in sumo - There is a different winner for each basho with Hasegawa, Kitanofuji, Kotozakura, Takamiyama, Tochiazuma I, and Wajima winning one yusho a piece. Takamiyama becomes first foreign born top division champion.
1971 in sumo - Kitanofuji and Tamanoumi II again vie for dominance with 3 and 2 yusho respectively, while an ageing Taihō wins his last title and retires. Tamanoumi dies suddenly in October after a delayed appendectomy.
1970 in sumo - Kitanofuji and Tamanoumi II vie for dominance with 3 and 2 yusho respectively, while Taihō manages just one. Kitanofuji and Tamanoumi are promoted to Yokozuna.

*Wakamisugi II would later become Wakanohana II

See also
Glossary of sumo terms
List of active sumo wrestlers
List of past sumo wrestlers
List of sumo record holders

years